Olof Hanner (7 December 1922 in Stockholm – 19 September 2015 in Gothenburg)
was a Swedish mathematician.

Education and career
Hanner earned his Ph.D. from Stockholm University in 1952. He was a professor at the University of Gothenburg from 1963 to 1989.

Contributions
In a 1956 paper, Hanner introduced the Hanner polytopes and the Hanner spaces having these polytopes as their metric balls. Hanner was interested in a Helly property of these shapes, later used to characterize them by : unlike other convex polytopes, it is not possible to find three translated copies of a Hanner polytope that intersect pairwise but do not have a point of common intersection. Subsequently, the Hanner polytopes formed a class of important examples for the Mahler conjecture and for Kalai's 3d conjecture. In another paper from the same year, Hanner proved a set of inequalities related to the uniform convexity of Lp spaces, now known as Hanner's inequalities.

Other contributions of Hanner include (with Hans Rådström) improving Werner Fenchel's version of Carathéodory's lemma, contributing to The Official Encyclopedia of Bridge, and doing early work on combinatorial game theory and the mathematics of the board game Go. One of the many proofs of the Pythagorean theorem based on the Pythagorean tiling
is sometimes called "Olof Hanner's Jigsaw Puzzle".

Selected publications
.
.
.
.
.
.

References

External links
 Olof Hanner at WorldCat 

 

1922 births
2015 deaths
Swedish mathematicians
Stockholm University alumni
Academic staff of the University of Gothenburg